The Ince Group plc is a United Kingdom-based holding company with a core business in legal services, which is listed on the London Stock Exchange. The company also offers complementary services in accounting, financial services, consulting, and pensions advice. It was previously known as Ince Gordon Dadds LLP, following the acquisition of Ince & Co by Gordon Dadds Group LLP, and rebranded as The Ince Group in August 2019.

In 2022, The Ince Group ranked 47th in The Lawyer UK 200 list, with £100.2 million in revenue during the previous year. As of 2021, the firm operated in 9 countries and had 21 offices, and employed over 700 employees worldwide, including support staff. The chief executive officer is Donald Brown, while the non-executive chairman is Simon Howard.

History

In 2017, Gordon Dadds LLP became the second law firm to list on the Alternative Investment Market (AIM) of the London Stock Exchange, raising £20 million, two years after Gateley became the first UK law firm to have an IPO. The Legal Services Act of 2007, which went into force in 2012, had made it possible for non-lawyers to own or invest in law firms organised as "alternative business structures". In 2018, Gordon Dadds acquired Metcalfes Solicitors in Bristol.

In early 2019, Gordon Dadds LLP acquired the UK and Chinese businesses of Ince & Co for an estimated £21 million in consideration, creating the largest publicly traded law firm in the UK based on revenue at the time, until DWF went public in March of that year. Both Gordon Dadds and Ince & Co were well established in the field of insurance law. Gordon Dadds was known for resolving large and complex disputes in the London and international markets, and had a private client and family practice, while Ince & Co was a network of international commercial law firms, specialising in the shipping and insurance sectors, as well as energy and aviation.

Six months into the merger, the firm rebranded the name of most of its legal businesses, including most of its international offices, to "Ince"; only its private client business then in Mayfair retained the name "Gordon Dadds". For its financial year 2020, the combined firm reported an 87% increase in revenue, followed by a slowdown in growth in subsequent years. On 13 March 2022, the firm's IT team shut down its servers after detecting a cyber attack; in April, it was granted an injunction to deter hackers from leaking its data online.

Notable lawyers

 Marie van der Zyl, employment lawyer and 48th president of the Board of Deputies of British Jews
 Lewis Pugh, former maritime lawyer who left Ince & Co to become an endurance swimmer and ocean advocate
 Philippe Ruttley, former EU and competition head at Ince who moved to Keystone Law

References

External links
The Ince Group (official web site)

Law firms of the United Kingdom
Companies based in the London Borough of Tower Hamlets
Law firms established in 1870
Foreign law firms with offices in Hong Kong
1870 establishments in England
British companies established in 1870
Companies listed on the Alternative Investment Market